The Port of Iloilo (Spanish: Puerto de Iloilo) in Iloilo City, Philippines, serves the province and city of Iloilo and the entire Panay Island, in Western Visayas of the Philippines. It is located away from the older port facilities on the Southern coast of Panay Island, in the Panay Gulf, and one of the country’s safest and most natural harbors.  Guimaras Island shields the port from violent storms and makes it ideal for harboring ships and vessels.

Location 
Iloilo harbor is part of the Iloilo Strait bounded to the north by a line stretching from the Dumangas River across the Iloilo Strait to Navalas Point on Guimaras Island and to the South line extending from the Lusaran Point, Guimaras Island to Surraga River in the municipality of San Joaquin on Panay.

Profile 
The Port of Iloilo, considered the leader of trade and a commercial hub for Western Visayas is also one of the safest natural seaports in the Philippines.  The Iloilo Commercial Port Complex is located on 20.8 hectares of reclaimed land. It includes 11,400 sq. meters of open space for operations, supplemented by an area of 97,000 sq. meters, a crane, rails of 348 lineal meters; roll-on-roll-off support; a 7,800 container freight stations; and a 720 sq. meter passenger shed. The port complex is ideal for ships plying international routes having a berth length of 400 meters, a width of 26.26 meters and a berthing depth of 10.50 meters.

A number of shipping companies use the Port of Iloilo, including Lorenzo Shipping Corporation, 2GO, Amigo Shipping Company, New Panay Shipping Company, Sulpicio Lines, and Trans-Asia Shipping Lines Inc. Fast ferries serve Iloilo-Bacolod routes eight times daily. 2GO inter-island, overnight ferries serve longer routes, going to Manila, Bacolod, Cebu, Zamboanga and Cagayan de Oro. Pumpboat ferries cross the Iloilo Strait to Guimaras constantly during the day and on special trips at night.

Roll-on/roll-off ferry service, known as RO-RO, is available between Iloilo City and Guimaras, but the ro-ro to Negros leaves from Dumangas, Iloilo.

It is ranked third in terms of ship calls at 11,853, fourth in cargo throughout at 491,719 million metric tons and fourth in passenger traffic at 2.4 million annually.

History

The Port has been serving international shipping since at least 1855, handling sugar and fertilizer shipments for the international market. The opening of the Port of Iloilo to the world market on 29 September 1855 by Queen Isabella II of Spain, replaced the disappearing textile industry. When the Suez Canal opened in 1869, trade with the Europe, especially the United Kingdom, became much easier. Nicholas Loney, consul for the U.K., was particularly influential and Muelle Loney, the quay that runs along the Iloilo River, is named after him.

The sugar industry brought an economic boom to the city and its neighbor island, Negros, and Iloilo became the biggest center of commerce and trade in the Visayas and Mindanao, second only to Manila.  It was the only deep water port for both Iloilo and Bacolod, capital of Negros Occidental which lay 35 miles away across the Guimaras Strait. Therefore, nearly all the trade in sugar and rice from Negros, one of the riches islands in the country, was shipped through Iloilo in the late 19th and early 20th centuries.

Shipping firms and destinations

Cokaliong Shipping Lines: Cebu
Montenegro Shipping Lines: Cuyo-Palawan, Puerto Princesa
2GO Travel: Bacolod, Cagayan de Oro, Manila
SuperCat: Bacolod
Ocean Jet: Bacolod
Weesam Express: Bacolod
Trans-Asia Shipping Lines: Cebu
FastCat:  Bacolod
Starlite Ferries: Batangas

Facilities

Bunkers are available from Pilipinas Shell, Petroleum Corporation, Caltex Philippines Inc. and Petrophil Corporation.

Data

The Port of Iloilo also offers Open Storage facilities, Data listed below:

See also
List of East Asian ports

References

External links 
 Philippine Ports Authority

Buildings and structures in Iloilo City
Iloilo Port
Transportation in Iloilo
Spanish colonial infrastructure in the Philippines